Francisco de Aguilar (born 1810 in Comayagua) was President of Honduras (acting): 8 November 1855 - 17 February 1856.

References 

1810 births
Year of death missing
People from Comayagua
Presidents of Honduras